Neil Edward James Mary Keith Harrold Lloyd Gunter (born ) is an English cricketer who played for Derbyshire from 2002 to 2004.

Gunter was born at Basingstoke, Hampshire. He played initially for Berkshire and joined Derbyshire in the 2002 season. Gunter was released from his duties in 2004, when even his bowling in the Second XI was becoming difficult for his team-mates to work with. He returned to Berkshire in 2005. He is a left-handed batsman and a right-arm medium-pace bowler.

External links
Neil Gunter at Cricket Archive 

1981 births
Living people
Berkshire cricketers
Cricketers from Basingstoke
Derbyshire cricketers
English cricketers